Paul Craig Cobb is a white nationalist and white supremacist who created the video sharing website Podblanc. He states "my race is my religion", and advocates "racial holy war" in accordance with the tenets of the Creativity religion. Cobb has gained attention from anti-racist and anti-fascist movements, and legal advocacy organizations investigating hate speech and hate crimes, for his "celebration of violence and murder committed against minorities", as documented in his video recordings, online activities, and disruptions of public events.

Cobb is known for his attempt to take over the city of Leith, North Dakota, with other white supremacists. The community has around 33 inhabitants. Cobb, who moved to Leith in 2012, attracted other white supremacists to the town and displayed white nationalist paraphernalia on his properties. Local residents and anti-racist organizations organized a protest in Leith against Cobb and his allies. Welcome to Leith, a documentary film about Cobb's attempt to take over Leith, was released in 2015.

Cobb has appeared on several radio talk shows to talk about his plans for the white supremacist movement in Leith. During his appearance on The Trisha Goddard Show, a DNA test from the company DDS performed on Cobb showed that he has 14% sub-Saharan African ancestry. However, Cobb retested with AncestryDNA which allegedly showed that he had 100% European ancestry.

Early life
He was born on 28 September 1952 to a medical officer and a doctor.

Youth and early adulthood 
Cobb says he was raised as a Christian, but has since denounced Christianity, saying "I don't understand Christians. They have a need to be morally superior than the next guy. ... They are very threatened by anything with racial cohesion."

After serving in the military, he lived in Edmonton, Alberta, Canada, for five years before moving to Hawaii, where he lived for another 25 years and earned a living as a taxi driver.

In 2003, he relocated to Frost, West Virginia, where he opened a grocery store and registered a business called "Gray's Store, Aryan Autographs and 14 Words, L.L.C." During this time, he was involved in unsolicited inter-state deliveries of a neo-Nazi newspaper published by Alex Linder, and distribution of Project Schoolyard CDs to local children,.

Moving abroad 
In late 2005, after receiving an inheritance of $85,000, he moved to Tallinn, Estonia. During this period, Cobb established Podblanc, a white supremacist video sharing website. His attempts to find an Estonian woman who would marry him were unsuccessful and he came to public attention after conducting an interview with a former Estonian Ministry of Justice employee whom he introduced as the leader of the Estonian Neo-Nazis. On August 25, 2009, he was issued a ten-year ban from Estonia and deported to Canada, where Cobb claims to hold citizenship, for "endangering state security, public order, public safety, moral standards, health, other public interests" and promoting racism. During his period of incarceration before deportation, his supporters in the US made contact with Canadian neo-fascist Paul Fromm in order to prepare for Cobb's anticipated arrest under Canadian hate speech laws. In March 2010, after posting videos of anti-racist activists online, he was discovered to be living in the Downtown Eastside area of Vancouver, British Columbia, where he also made an unsuccessful attempt to register a non-profit society called Whitepeace.

Returning to the US 
In June 2010, Cobb was arrested by police in Vancouver, but released with a summons after which he left Canada to return to the United States. In 2010, Cobb was living in Kalispell, Montana, which was a recruiting target for several white nationalists.  Cobb engaged in a feud with another local neo-Nazi, Karl Gharst, against whom he had filed a restraining order in October 2010. His activities were opposed by the local pro-tolerance group Love Lives Here. At the end of December 2010, Canadian authorities issued a warrant for his arrest on the charge of "willful promotion of hatred" after a failure to appear". Cobb responded to the warrant by stating "You can find me in the orange easy chair near the elevator" at the Flathead County Library in Kalispell.

Leith, North Dakota

Cobb relocated to western North Dakota for its supply of high-paying jobs at oil fields and its high proportion of white residents. He claimed that he was fired from a job over disagreements with a co-worker, and that he lost a job with a Fargo paving company after there was media coverage of his settlement plans. While Cobb was working in Watford City, North Dakota, he found on Craigslist that there were lots available for sale in Leith, North Dakota.  As of December 2013, Cobb lived in Leith, where he tried to create a white supremacist community. By August 2013, he had purchased 13 plots of land in the town. Several other prominent white supremacists, including April Gaede and her husband, also own land in Leith. He has transferred ownership of two plots to fellow white supremacists Alex Linder and Tom Metzger.  Another white supremacist, Jeff Schoep, visited Leith in late September 2013 in order to support Cobb, and he brought several fellow members of the National Socialist Movement with him. Several former members of Anti-Racist Action formed a peaceful, grassroots movement called UnityND and began organizing a demonstration of their own in Leith, that would protest against both Cobb and Schoep. Several hundred people attended the protests against Cobb and his allies, including hundreds of members of the Standing Rock Indian Reservation. As a reaction to Cobb's planned takeover of Leith, some have even advocated disbanding Leith and dissolving it into Grant County proper. Cobb stated that he will pursue to file a restraining order against the Standing Rock Indian Reservation.

Plans for expansion
Cobb expressed interest in purchasing lots in Regan, North Dakota, and Crosby, North Dakota, and said he would leave Leith if his charges will be dropped. In February 2014, he sold his house in Leith and one other plot of land to a man from neighboring Carson, and in March he deeded his remaining lots back to Leith. Of the lots he originally purchased, three remain owned by Alex Linder, Tom Metzger, and Jeff Schoep. The lot owned by Linder was seized for non payment of property taxes. In 2016, he started dating a 38 year old paralegal from Texas, Emily Henderson, who is also a White Nationalist and had been a member of The World Church of the Creator, joining the same year Cobb did, 2002. After meeting in person in Missouri and spending more time together, they decided to remain a couple and she moved to Sherwood, North Dakota to be with him. He was on probation in the State of North Dakota at that time. They were both mentioned in the local media when they tried to buy a house in Landa and were turned away. Cobb wanted to buy a church in Nome, North Dakota and Henderson wrote the contract for it. When the church, which was not insured, burned in 2017, the contract was so iron clad that all the monies were returned to Cobb.
Henderson and Cobb both own homes in Sherwood, North Dakota and are trying to expand their family. Cobb has been off probation since 2018.

Legal issues
In September 2013, Custer Health Environmental Services in Mandan, North Dakota, which provides safety and sanitation inspections for five counties, including Grant County, had issued 12 citations that month to 10 individuals, including Cobb. Citing Cobb's failure to install a running water and sewage system in his properties within the 30-day deadline, the health unit announced that it would seek a court order to condemn his properties, unless he cooperated and released a plan detailing future water and sewage installation. Afterwards, Cobb announced that he had no intention of cooperating with the health unit and planned to fight the eviction notice.

Arrest and release on probation
In November 2013, Cobb and Kynan Dutton were arrested by two Grant county deputies and held in the Mercer County jail. Dutton was already out on bond for a previous drunk and disorderly conduct charge. Cobb was upset, claiming his property was vandalized by the town's residents; two videos from their subsequent 'patrol' were posted on YouTube. They were booked on suspicion of terrorizing. Ultimately, the two were charged with six counts of "terrorizing". However, the district attorney dropped the second of seven original counts after one man—acting as a reporter in some capacity—later claimed that he "did not feel threatened". According to the Leith website developer, Cobb and the other man arrested held the guns high and then lowered them, but did not speak and did not point the guns directly at the men.  The two men subsequently appeared in court for a bond hearing, and the court decided that both should be held without bail. He refused food while in prison, but said that his refusal was not a hunger strike; rather, he was practising mahasamādhi and that he believed he would leave his physical body for another "plane of existence" at Yuletide. He also said he considers himself a martyr. Together with his follower Kynan Dutton the two men were scheduled for a preliminary hearing on seven felony accounts of terrorism to be held on January 13, 2014.
His bail was set at $1 million.

After a plea agreement, Cobb was released on April 29, 2014, on four years' probation and time served. Leith's Mayor Ryan Schock and Councilman Lee Cook, who was one of Cobb's victims, expressed concerns for the town's safety because Cobb had given property to white separatist Tom Metzger, National Socialist Movement Commander Jeff Schoep and white supremacist Alex Linder. Cobb himself had earlier announced his "retirement from white nationalism" and has said that he will seek permission to transfer his probation to Missouri where he will look after his mother.

State of North Dakota vs. Paul Craig Cobb (CASE NO. 19-2013-CR-00043)
Seven charges, two of terrorizing, five of menacing.

12.1-17-04. Terrorizing.
A person is guilty of a class C felony if, with intent to place another human being in fear for that human being's or another's safety or to cause evacuation of a building, place of assembly, or facility of public transportation, or otherwise to cause serious disruption or public inconvenience, or in reckless disregard of the risk of causing such terror, disruption, or inconvenience, the person:
1. Threatens to commit any crime of violence or act dangerous to human life; or
2. Falsely informs another that a situation dangerous to human life or commission of a
crime of violence is imminent knowing that the information is false.

12.1-17-05. Menacing.
A person is guilty of a class A misdemeanor if he knowingly places or attempts to place another human being in fear by menacing him with imminent serious bodily injury.

Cobb, an indigent-defendant in this case, having been held in what can only be described as a prolonged and ill-founded custody based on suspicion of terrorizing and menace, pled guilty to menace counts 1, 3, 4, 5, 7, and terrorizing count 6 on 05/12/2014. Terrorizing, count 2, was dismissed.

For counts 1, 3, 4, 5, 7, credit for time served was 167 days, but count 6 is listed later in the narrative of the Register of Action of the court case, so I cannot confirm if the credit for time served applies to said count as well.

North Dakota is a beautiful state, with a beautiful, healthy culture, and it appears that the natural generosity of the people of North Dakota was perverted in what is seemingly a case that has at most "the color of law", whatever else the defendant in the case might deserve.

The statutes for the terrorizing count which was not dismissed establishes either of two distinct behaviors, both vocal, which would make a defendant subject to an accusation for the charge. The accused must 'threaten to commit'; or 'falsely inform'. The footage of the patrols does not document Cobb as fulfilling those conditions.

The statutes for the menacing five menacing counts have as the active element the 'imminent serious bodily injury', the remainder of the text which precedes it being a prefatory-explanation in the face of the active element of the charge.

Media appearances and genetic testing
In October 2013, Cobb was featured as a guest on The Trisha Goddard Show, where he met with the lone black resident of Leith and his white wife. The couple said that their lives were being disrupted and that their experience in Leith since Cobb moved in was being ridden with "turmoil and deception". The episode featured Shahrazad Ali, who agreed with Cobb on the concept of racial separation. In a November 2013 interview, Goddard revealed the results of a DNA test, to which Cobb had agreed, indicating that he was genetically 14 percent Sub-Saharan African. Cobb dismissed the results as "statistical noise". USA Today report that this may have been a contributing factor in arguments between Cobb and Dutton which led to their arrest.

Antler, North Dakota
In 2015, Cobb attempted to purchase $69,000 worth of property in Antler, North Dakota, in an attempt to take over the town and rename it "Trump".  This is a reference to Donald Trump, whom Cobb says he admires.

Nebraska
In 2015, Cobb purchased three foreclosed properties, two in Red Cloud, Nebraska and one in Inavale, Nebraska. He stated that these purchases were part of another plan to establish an all-white community.  A local court blocked the sale after nearby town residents were able to pay the back taxes for the properties.

Video recordings and disruptions
Cobb's video recordings fall into two types of productions. The first consists of unedited presentations of antisemitic canards commentary and discussion featuring close-up shots of himself, often presented as part of his "Deprogram" series on YouTube and Podblanc. The second consists of street interviews gathered at events where Cobb presents himself as a journalist for Vanguard News Network, asks a series of provocative questions laced with racial slurs, typically sparking outrage from targeted individuals. Documented incidents include a rally in Kingston, New York in 2005 and a 50 Cent concert in Tallinn in 2008. One such disruption occurred in October 2005 at the U.S. Capitol Rotunda as civil rights leader Rosa Parks was lying in state. Cobb confronted visitors, referred to Parks as a "shitskin communist", and stated that he was there to celebrate her death.

Online activities
Cobb posts under his own name on the Stormfront website and under the pseudonym "Chain" (on Podblanc), which references the abolition of the National Origins Formula in the Immigration and Nationality Act of 1965. While his internet activities center upon "tireless propaganda" for Podblanc he is also active in discussion boards where, after the arrest of Matt Hale in 2003 for soliciting the murder of U.S. District Judge Joan Lefkow, Cobb posted the judge's home address, family photographs and a map to her house. Lefkow's husband and mother were subsequently murdered, albeit by somebody not affiliated with Cobb or white supremacy. In reply to a reporter's question "What were you feeling when the double murder happened?" Cobb stated "What was I feeling? Emotions are not yet illegal. I was just fine with it. I think it was well done."

References

External links
 

Living people
American emigrants to Canada
American expatriates in Estonia
American neo-Nazis
Canadian Holocaust deniers
Canadian neo-Nazis
Converts to pagan religions from Christianity
American taxi drivers
People from Boston
People from Missouri
Year of birth missing (living people)